The Women's 4x200m Freestyle Relay event at the 2003 Pan American Games took place on August 12, 2003 (Day 11 of the Games). There were only six entries and therefore no preliminary heats for this event.

Medalists

Results

Notes

References
swimmers-world

Freestyle Relay, Women's 4x200m
2003 in women's swimming
Swim